SCU may refer to:

Computing
 SAS control unit, a hardware component that controls Serial attached SCSI devices
 Single compilation unit, C/C++ specific compilation technique
 System Control Unit for Sega Saturn chip set

Sport 

 SoCal Uncensored, a professional wrestling stable often referred to as SCU

Unions
 Scottish Cyclist's Union, the sports governing body for cycling in Scotland, now known as Scottish Cycling
 Service Credit Union, New Hampshire
 Sikorsky Credit Union, Connecticut
 Steinbach Credit Union, Canada

Units 
 Serious Crash Unit, a New Zealand television series
 Scoville Units on the Scoville scale measure the hotness or piquancy of sauces
 Special Commando Unit, employed by the MACV-SOG during the Vietnam War
 Street Crimes Unit, part of the New York Police Department
 Santa Clara Unit, an operational unit of the California Department of Forestry and Fire Protection responsible for the East and South Bay regions of the Bay Area.

Universities
 Santa Clara University, California, United States
 Sapporo City University, Japan
 Scott Christian University, Machakos, Kenya
 Shih Chien University, Taipei, Taiwan
 Sichuan University, Chengdu, China
 Seoul Cyber University, Seoul, Korea
 Soochow University (disambiguation), multiple schools
 Southern California University of Health Sciences, Whittier, California
 Southern Cross University, Lismore, NSW, Australia
 Southwestern Christian University, Bethany, Oklahoma
 Suez Canal University, Ismailia, Egypt
 Shahid Chamran University, Ahvaz, Iran
 Soegijapranata Catholic University, Semarang, Indonesia

Other uses 
 Antonio Maceo Airport in Santiago de Cuba, Cuba (IATA airport code: SCU)
 Sacra Corona Unita, a Mafia-like criminal organization from Apulia, southern Italy
 SCU Lightning Complex fires, a group of wildfires in California
 Senatus consultum ultimum, something tantamount to martial law in the times of the Roman Republic
 Service Class User, a term used in the DICOM standard

See also